The Historical flags of the British Empire and the overseas territories refers to the various flags that were used across the various Dominions, Crown colonies, protectorates, territories which made up the British Empire and current overseas territories. Early flags that were used across the Empire (In particular the then Thirteen Colonies which would later become the United States of America) tended to variations of the Red and Blue Ensigns of Great Britain with no colonial badges or coat of arms attached to them. In the first half of the 19th Century, the first colonies started to acquire their own colony badges, but it was not until the UK Parliament passed the Colonial Naval Defence Act 1865 that the colonies were required to apply their own emblems.

The following list contains all former and current flags that were used across the Empire and as well as current British overseas territories until 1999.

Historical Flags of the British Empire and the overseas territories

Aden

Anguilla

Antigua and Barbuda

Australia

 Note: Australia formally became an independent country from the United Kingdom under the Statute of Westminster Adoption Act 1942 which formally adopted the Statute of Westminster 1931 and backdated the adoption to 3 September 1939.

Australian States

Bahama Islands

Bahrain

Barbados

Basutoland

Bermuda

British America

British Antarctic Territory

British Cameroon

British Central Africa Protectorate

British Ceylon

British Columbia Colony

British East Africa

British Guiana

British Hong Kong

British Honduras

British India

British Indian Ocean Territory

British Leeward Islands

British New Hebrides

British Malaya

British Straits Settlements

British Mauritius

British Nigeria (Northern & Southern)

British Solomon Islands

British Somaliland

British Virgin Islands

British West Africa

British Windward Islands

Burma

Brunei

Canada

Note: Canada formally became an independent country from the United Kingdom under the Statute of Westminster 1931.

Cayman Islands

Cape Colony

Cook Islands

Cyprus

Dominica

Falkland Islands & Dependencies

Fiji

Gambia Colony and Protectorate

Gibraltar

Grenada

Gilbert and Ellice Islands

Gilbert Islands

Gold Coast

Heligoland

Ionian Islands

Iraq

Ireland

Jamaica

Kedah

Kenya

Kuwait

Labuan

Lagos Colony

Lower Canada

Malacca

Maldives

Malta

Montserrat

Mosquito Coast

Muscat and Oman

Natal Colony

New Guinea

New South Wales Colony

Newfoundland

New Zealand

 Note: Although it had been self-governing since 1852, New Zealand formally became an independent country from the United Kingdom under the Statute of Westminster Adoption Act 1947, which adopted the Statute of Westminster 1931.

Niger Coast Protectorate

North Borneo

Nova Scotia

Nyasaland

Orange River Colony

Palestine

Territory of Papua

Penang

Pitcairn Islands

Province of Canada

Qatar

Queensland Colony

Saint Christopher-Nevis-Anguilla

Saint Helena and Dependencies

Saint Lucia

Saint Vincent and the Grenadines

Seychelles

Sierra Leone

South Australia Colony

South Georgia and the South Sandwich Islands

South Africa

 Note: South Africa formally became an independent country from the United Kingdom in 1931 after formally adopting the Statute of Westminster.

Rhodesia (Northern & Southern)

Sarawak

Singapore

Egypt

Tanganyika

Tasmania Colony

Jordan

Transvaal Colony

Trinidad and Tobago

Tuvalu

Turks and Caicos Islands

Trucial States

Uganda

Upper Canada

Victoria Colony

Weihaiwei

Western Australia Colony

Western Samoa

West Indies Federation

Zanzibar

Historical Governor's flags

Others

See also
 British ensign
 British Empire
 British Blue Ensign 
 British Red Ensign
 Flag of the United Kingdom
 Flag of Australia
 Flag of Canada
 Flag of New Zealand

References

Flags of the British Empire
Flags of the United Kingdom
Flags of Australia
National symbols of Australia
Flags of Canada
National symbols of Canada
Flags of New Zealand
National symbols of New Zealand
Governance of the British Empire
National symbols of the United Kingdom
History of the Commonwealth of Nations
British Empire
Historical flags